Casignana is a comune (municipality) in the Province of Reggio Calabria in the Italian region Calabria, located about  southwest of Catanzaro and about  east of Reggio Calabria.

Casignana borders the following municipalities: Bianco, Bovalino, Caraffa del Bianco, San Luca, Sant'Agata del Bianco.

Festivals 
On 16 August the festival of San Rocco is held. Many rides, food and fun activities surround the town on this special day. It is celebrated by carrying the statue of San Rocco around the town as a symbol of his travels then entering the statue in the church symbolises his canonisation as a saint.
Easter day is celebrated by reenacting the frunttata (resurrection of Jesus Christ) with holy icons and statues followed by mass and the sacrifice of a lamb to represent the death Of Christ.
After Easter day it is paquarella; on this day it is time to go into the country and harvest the wheat and crops of that summer. It also is a time to picnic in Aspromonte National Park to eat all the leftovers of the Easter celebration.

Demographic evolution

References

Image:Casignana-1-.gif

Cities and towns in Calabria